Walter Hill is a rural locality in the Cassowary Coast Region, Queensland, Australia.

Geography 
There are two named peaks on the ridgeline:

References 

Cassowary Coast Region
Localities in Queensland